Kap Choeng is a district (amphoe) in the southern part of Surin province, northeastern Thailand.

History
The village of Ban Kap Choeng is about 200 years old. It was originally under sub-district (tambon) Dan of Sangkha district, but 1937 was moved to Tambon Nong Yai, Prasat district. In 1964, it became part of the newly created sub-district of Kap Choeng.

On 25 May 1975, Tambon Kap Choeng and Bakdai were combined to form a minor district (king amphoe). Tambon Khok Klang was created in 1976, Tambons Dan and Khu Tan were transferred to it from Sangkha in 1977. On 20 March 1979, Kap Choeng was upgraded to a full district.

Geography
Neighboring districts are (from the west clockwise): Phanom Dong Rak, Prasat and Sangkha of Surin Province. To the south is Oddar Meancheay of Cambodia.

The southern part of this district is in the Dângrêk Mountains. An international border crossing into Cambodia is called the Chong Chom Checkpoint which is located in Dan village in the southern part of this district. The checkpoint on the Cambodian side is called O Smach International Checkpoint in Samraong Municipality, Oddar Meanchey province.

Administration
The district is divided into six sub-districts (tambons), which are further subdivided into 91 villages (mubans). There are no municipal (thesaban) areas. There are six tambon administrative organizations (TAO).

Missing numbers are tambons which now form Phanom Dong Rak District.

References

External links
amphoe.com

Kap Choeng
Cambodia–Thailand border crossings